Bayonet is a 2018 Finnish-Mexican drama film directed by Kyzza Terrazas and written by Rodrigo Marquez-Tizano and Kyzza Terrazas.

Cast 
 Brontis Jodorowsky as Denis
 Miriam Balderas as Erika
 Laura Birn as Sarita
 Jarmo Esko as Man in apartment
 Harrison Jones as press cameraman
 Ilkka Koivula as Jyrki
 Dom Lamar as Press Cameraman
 Luis Gerardo Méndez as Miguel
  as Remu
 Ville Virtanen as Jaakko

References

External links 
 
 

2018 films
Finnish drama films
Spanish-language Netflix original films
2010s Spanish-language films
Mexican drama films
2018 drama films
2010s Mexican films